Omorgus curvipes is a species of hide beetle in the subfamily Omorginae.

References

curvipes
Beetles described in 1872